Hayono Isman (born 25 April 1955) is a senior figure within Indonesian politics. He was a member of the People's Representative Council, representing Jakarta's 1st electoral district, between 2009 and 2014.

Isman was born in Surabaya, East Java.  He has been a member of the Indonesian parliament twice, and he was the Indonesian minister for sports from 17 March 1993 until the 16 Match 1998.

In March 2010 he met with lords from the British House of Lords where they praised Indonesia's progress in democracy, media freedom and environmental protection.

References

1963 births
Living people
Indonesian diplomats
People from Surabaya
Government ministers of Indonesia
Members of the People's Representative Council, 1987
Members of the People's Representative Council, 1992
Members of the People's Representative Council, 2009